Murtry Aqueduct is a three-arched aqueduct that was intended to carry the Dorset and Somerset Canal over the Mells River, near Frome in Somerset, England. It is a grade II listed building.

Construction
The aqueduct was built as part of an 8-mile branch of the canal between Frome and Nettlebridge. This branch was never completed and work on the rest of the canal was never started, so Murtry Aqueduct was never filled with water. The aqueduct has some decorative architectural features, including rusticated spandrels and plain pilasters between the arches.

At the east end there is a skew arch, smaller than the three main arches, running underneath the canal bed. This skew arch is part of the aqueduct's south face, but it is separated from the aqueduct on the north side.

See also

Dorset and Somerset Canal
List of canal aqueducts in Great Britain

References

Navigable aqueducts in England
Canals in England
Canals in Somerset
Bridges in Somerset
Canals opened in 1795
Grade II listed bridges
Grade II listed buildings in Mendip District